The 63rd season of the Campeonato Gaúcho kicked off on June 16, 1983, and ended on December 3, 1983. Twelve teams participated. Internacional won their 28th title. no teams were relegated.

Participating teams

System 
The championship would have two stages.:

 First phase: The twelve clubs played each other in a double round-robin system. The eight best teams qualified to the Final phase, with the four best teams qualifying to a one-legged playoff to define the two teams that would receive one bonus point for the Final phase, and in addition to that, the two best teams from the hinterland earned one bonus point too.
 Final phase: The eight remaining teams played each other in a double round-robin system; the team with the most points won the title.

Championship

First phase

Extra points playoffs 
According to the regulations, the teams with the best performances would have the home advantage in the playoffs. However, since Grêmio and São Paulo had ended up tied in both points and goal difference, a playoff to define where the main playoff match would be played was held in neutral ground.

Final phase

Second Place Playoffs

References 

Campeonato Gaúcho seasons
Gaúcho